Reginald Randolph Naylor (11 November 1897 – 23 November 1945) was an  Australian rules footballer who played with Hawthorn in the Victorian Football League (VFL).

Naylor played for Prahran for six years before joining Hawthorn in 1927, after initially being refused a permit in 1925.

Notes

External links 

1897 births
1945 deaths
Australian rules footballers from Victoria (Australia)
Australian Rules footballers: place kick exponents
Hawthorn Football Club players
Prahran Football Club players